is a Japanese light novel and manga writer. Some of his major works include The Legend of the Legendary Heroes, A Dark Rabbit Has Seven Lives and Seraph of the End, which have been adapted into anime series.

Works
 The Legend of the Legendary Heroes
 A Dark Rabbit Has Seven Lives
 Seraph of the End
 Apocalypse Alice

References

External links
  
 Takaya Kagami manga at Media Arts Database 
 

20th-century Japanese novelists
21st-century Japanese novelists
Living people
1979 births